The Levant sparrowhawk (Accipiter brevipes) is a small bird of prey. The female is larger than the male, but the difference is not as marked as with Eurasian sparrowhawk. The adult male is blue-grey above, with dark wingtips, and barred reddish below.

The adult female is slate-grey above with darkish wingtips. She is barred reddish brown below, and may show a dark throat line. The juvenile is dark brown above and has dark-streaked underparts. It shows a dark throat line. It breeds in forests from Greece and the Balkans east to southern Russia. It is migratory, wintering from Egypt across to southwestern Iran. It will migrate in large flocks, unlike the more widespread Eurasian sparrowhawk.

The Levant sparrowhawk nests in trees, building a new nest, lined with green leaves, each year. The normal clutch is 3–5 eggs. It hunts small birds, insects, rodents, and lizards in woodland or semi-desert areas, relying on surprise as it flies from a perch to catch its prey unaware.

This bird is a small raptor with short broad wings and a longish tail, both adaptations to manoeuvring through trees. It is similar to the Eurasian sparrowhawk, but its shorter tail and more pointed wings give it a more falcon-like appearance.

The flight of this hawk is a characteristic flap – flap – glide.

The call is a sharp kee-wick.

Taxonomy
First described by Nikolai Alekseevich Severtzov in 1850, the Levant sparrowhawk is a small bird of prey in the genus Accipiter. It is sometimes considered to be a subspecies of the shikra, though it differs in measurements, proportions and plumage, and breeds contiguously with the latter (typically considered a reliable indicator of speciation) over at least part of its range. Along with the shikra, the Chinese sparrowhawk and the Nicobar sparrowhawk, it makes up a complex species group. It is known to have hybridised with the shikra and the Eurasian sparrowhawk. Despite its extensive range, it has no subspecies.

The genus name Accipiter is a Latin word meaning "hawk" (from the Latin word accipere, meaning "to grasp"). The species name brevipes is a combination of the Latin words brevis, meaning "short" and pes, meaning "foot"; this is a reference to the bird's short toes.

Description
As with all raptors, the female is larger than the male. The adult male is blue-grey above and pale below, with underparts and leg feathers finely barred in rufous and white. His head is blue-grey as well, with a white throat bisected by a dark central stripe (sometimes quite faint). The female is similar, though her plumage is generally a darker brownish-grey. Both sexes have orangish-yellow legs and a yellow cere.

Behaviour

Breeding

The Levant sparrowhawk breeds from mid-May through August. The pair is territorial while breeding, often performing high-circling aerial displays. The female is thought to make the nest. She builds a new one every year, a small structure of twigs on a branch or in a fork of a broad-leaved tree. The nest tree is often near running water, typically in open woodland, on a forest edge, or in an isolated clump of trees.

Hatching is asynchronous. Nestlings fledge some  after hatching, and are independent about  later.

Flight and migration
Though able to flap continually (like most birds), Levant sparrowhawks typically use soaring-and-gliding flight while migrating; they also use thermals when those are available, and are known to occasionally hover.

Population
In Armenia the population of Levant Sparrowhawks is estimated as 180–220 breeding pairs.

Conservation and threats
Because of its vast range and stable population, the Levant Sparrowhawk is listed as a species of least concern by the International Union for Conservation of Nature. The development of wind farms may affect its numbers.

References

Citations

Cited texts

External links

 
 
 
 
 

Levant sparrowhawk
Levant sparrowhawk
Birds of prey of Europe
Birds of Western Asia